Khauff (translation: Fear) is a 2000 Indian Hindi-language action thriller film directed by Sanjay Gupta, starring Sanjay Dutt and Manisha Koirala. It was a remake of the Hollywood film The Juror.

Plot
Neha witnesses the Mafia slaying of a police officer and is forced to give a confession to the police, putting her life in danger. Meanwhile, Neha falls in love with Vicky, aka Babu. However, she realizes Vicky is not really who he is and is just a killer hired to prevent her from testifying against the culprits. Than begins her uncertain life. In the end, Babu kills all the culprits, Neha kills Samrat, and himself is killed by Neha as he killed all her dear ones so that she can be alive. Before dying, Babu realises his mistake and says that he has done a good job, thus ending the fearful life which made her life a hell.

Cast
 Sanjay Dutt as Babu
 Manisha Koirala as Neha Verma
 Sharad Kapoor as Inspector Arjun (as Sharad Kapoor)
 Simran as Ritu Pereira
 Mukesh Khanna as ACP Jaidev Singh
 Suresh Oberoi as Mr. Singhania
 Tinnu Anand as Advocate Bansal
 Jaspal Bhatti as Hawa Singh
 Farida Jalal as Mrs. Jaidev Singh
 Parmeet Sethi as Samrat Singhania
 Navin Nischol as Judge
 Daler Mehndi as himself in Nach Baby
 Raveena Tandon as herself in Nach Baby

Production
The film started production in 1997 but, due to various delays, was completed and released in 2000. Sunil Shetty was signed for Sharad Kapoor's role but opted out later. Sunny Deol was originally approached to play Sanjay Dutt's role but declined it as he told director Sanjay Gupta that his fans would not like him in a villain role. Rajat Bedi was signed for the film but was later replaced by Parmeet Sethi.

Music

All tracks were given by Anu Malik and one song from duo Sajid–Wajid for "Raja Ki Qaid Mein". The song "Kehte Hain Jo Log Ishq Walon Ko Samjhaaye (Jo Dil Rakhta Hai Wo Mauj)" was included in the film at a later stage. However, its sound track and further details are not available. The song was featured in the top 10 shows aired on television at that time.

Track listing

References

External links

2000 films
2000s Hindi-language films
Indian action thriller films
Films shot in Mumbai
Films scored by Anu Malik
2000 action thriller films
Juries in fiction
Films about contract killing in India
Indian remakes of American films
Films directed by Sanjay Gupta